Delwan Graham (born October 27, 1988) is an American professional basketball player for REG of the Basketball Africa League (BAL).

Club career
In December 2019, Graham returned to Kharkiv and signed with Kharkivski Sokoly.

On February 21, 2023, Graham joined Rwandan club REG ahead of the 2023 BAL season.

References

1988 births
Living people
American expatriate basketball people in Ukraine
American men's basketball players
Omaha Mavericks men's basketball players
BC Kharkivski Sokoly players
BC Politekhnik players
REG BBC players